Carlos E. Colombino Frechou (born 15 January 1938) is a Uruguayan equestrian. He competed in two events at the 1960 Summer Olympics.

Notes

References

External links
 

1938 births
Living people
Uruguayan male equestrians
Olympic equestrians of Uruguay
Equestrians at the 1960 Summer Olympics
Sportspeople from Montevideo
20th-century Uruguayan people